The CAC Small (formerly the CAC Small 90) is a stock market index used by the Paris Bourse. It is a small-cap index which represents all main-market French equities not included in the CAC 40, the CAC Next 20 or the CAC Mid 60. Together, these 4 indices make up the CAC All-Tradable. Originally consisting of 90 listings, the index was revamped to include a wider range of stocks in March 2011.

Index composition 
, the index was composed of the following 179 companies:
 2CRSI
 AST Groupe
 AB Science
 ABC Arbitrage
 ABEO
 Abionyx Pharma SA
 Abivax
 Acteos
 ACTIA Group
 ADLPartner
 Adocia
 AdUx
 Advenis
 Advicenne
 Afone Participations
 AKKA Technologies SE
 AKWEL
 Albioma
 Compagnie des Alpes
 Altur Investissement
 Amoéba
 Amplitude Surgical
 Antalis
 ARCHOS
 Artmarket.com
 Atari SA
 Ateme
 Aubay
 Aurea
 Aures Technologies
 Avenir Telecom S.A.
 AwoX
 Axway Software
 Balyo
 Bastide Le Confort Médical
 Le Bélier
 Bénéteau
 Bigben Interactive
 BOIRON
 Bonduelle
 BOURBON Corporation
 Business & Decision
 Capelli
 Carmila
 Cast
 Catana Group
 Catering International Services
 Chargeurs
 Cibox Inter@ctive
 Claranova
 Cogelec
 CS Group
 Dalet
 Dedalus France
 Delta Plus Group
 Derichebourg
 Devoteam
 DMS (Diagnostic Medical Systems)
 Egide
 Ekinops
 ENGIE EPS
 EOS imaging
 ERYTECH Pharma
 ESI Group
 Esso S.A.F.
 EuropaCorp
 Fermentalg
 FFP
 Figeac Aéro
 Foncière Paris Nord
 La Française de l'Energie
 GEA (Grenobloise d'Electronique et d'Automatismes)
 GECI International
 Generix Group
 Genkyotex
 Genomic Vision
 GenSight Biologics
 GL events
 Groupe CRIT
 Groupe Flo
 Groupe Gorgé
 Groupe Open
 Groupe SFPI
 Guerbet
 Guillemot Corporation
 Haulotte Group
 Hexaom
 HighCo
 HiPay Group
 Hopscotch Groupe
 ID Logistics Group
 IGE+XAO
 Immobilière Dassault
 Infotel
 Innate Pharma
 Innelec Multimédia
 Interparfums
 Inventiva
 IT Link
 Itesoft
 ITS Group
 Jacques Bogart
 Jacquet Metal Service
 Kaufman & Broad
 Keyrus
 Lacroix
 Latécoère
 Lectra
 Linedata Services
 LISI
 LNA Santé
 LUMIBIRD
 Lysogene
 Manitou Group
 Mauna Kea Technologies
 Maurel & Prom
 Marie Brizard Wine & Spirits
 McPhy Energy
 Media 6
 Mediawan
 Memscap
 Mersen
 METabolic EXplorer
 Micropole
 Nanobiotix
 Navya
 Neoen
 Netgem
 Nicox
 Oeneo
 Olympique Lyonnais Groupe
 Onxeo
 Orapi
 Orchestra-Prémaman
 OSE Immunotherapeutics
 Paragon ID
 Passat
 Pharmagest Interactive
 Pierre & Vacances
 Pixium Vision
 Plastiques du Val-de-Loire
 Poxel
 Prodways Group
 Prologue
 PSB Industries
 Recyclex
 Riber
 Robertet
 Société Centrale des Bois et Scieries de la Manche
 Séché Environnement
 SergeFerrari Group
 SES-imagotag
 SRP Groupe
 Signaux Girod
 SII
 SMCP S.A
 Société Marseillaise du Tunnel Prado-Carénage
 Sogeclair S.A
 SoLocal Group
 Spir Communication
 SQLI
 Stef
 Sword Group
 Synergie
 Technicolor
 Tikehau Capital
 TOUAX SCA
 Tour Eiffel (Société de la)
 Transgene
 Union Financière de France Banque
 Union Technologies Informatique Group
 Valneva SE
 Verimatrix
 Vilmorin & Cie
 Voluntis
 Wavestone
 X-FAB Silicon Foundries SE
 Xilam Animation
 Ymagis

See also 
 CAC 40
 CAC Next 20
 CAC Mid 60
 CAC All-Tradable

References

French stock market indices
Lists of companies of France
Euronext indices